Stânceşti may refer to several villages in Romania:

 Stâncești, a village in Buntești Commune, Bihor County
 Stâncești, a village in Mihai Eminescu Commune, Botoșani County
 Stâncești, a village in Dobra Commune, Hunedoara County

See also
 Stăncești (disambiguation)
 Stânca (disambiguation)